Dost Garibon Ka is a Hindi language movie produced by Firoz A. Nadiadwala starring Govinda and Neelam. The movie was directed by C. P. Dixit and was released in 1989.

Cast
Govinda as Vijay / Barkat Ali
Neelam as Rekha
Satish Shah as Barkat Ali Khan / Bholeram
Raza Murad as Thakur Ranjeet Singh
Om Shivpuri as Dharamdas
Vijay Arora as Dinanath  
Anjana Mumtaz as Laxmi  
Rajendra Nath as Restaurant Owner
Dan Dhanoa as Dan

Soundtrack
Movie featured 5 songs. Music was by Laxmikant-Pyarelal and lyrics by Anand Bakshi. 

Govinda
Neelam

References

External links
 

1980s Hindi-language films
Films scored by Laxmikant–Pyarelal